Kinnoul may refer to:

 Kinnoul, Queensland, a locality in the Shire of Banana, Australia
 Kinnoull, Scotland